Claudio Marescotti, O.S.B. (1520–1590) was a Roman Catholic prelate who served as Bishop of Strongoli (1587–1590).

Biography
Claudio Marescotti was born in 1520 and ordained a priest in the Order of Saint Benedict.
On 18 Feb 1587, he was appointed during the papacy of Pope Sixtus V as Bishop of Strongoli.
On 19 May 1587, he was consecrated bishop by Gabriele Paleotti, Archbishop of Bologna, with Annibale Grassi, Bishop of Faenza, and Vincenzo Casali, Bishop of Massa Marittima, serving as co-consecrators. 
He served as Bishop of Strongoli until his death on 24 Feb 1590.

References

External links and additional sources
 (for Chronology of Bishops) 
 (for Chronology of Bishops) 

16th-century Italian Roman Catholic bishops
Bishops appointed by Pope Sixtus V
1520 births
1590 deaths
Benedictine bishops